The 2006–07 Belarusian Extraliga season was the 15th season of the Belarusian Extraliga, the top level of ice hockey in Belarus. 11 teams participated in the league, and HC Dinamo Minsk won the championship.

Regular season

Playoffs
Quarterfinals
HK Keramin Minsk - Metallurg Zhlobin 3-1 on series
Khimik-SKA Novopolotsk - HK Khimvolokno Mogilev 3-1 on series
HC Dinamo Minsk - HK Neman Grodno 3-0 on series
HK Yunost Minsk - HK Gomel 3-2 on series
Semifinals
HK Keramin Minsk - Khimik-SKA Novopolotsk 3-0 on series
HC Dinamo Minsk - HK Yunost Minsk 3-1 on series
Final
HC Dinamo Minsk - HK Keramin Minsk 4-1 on series

External links 
 Season on hockeyarchives.info

Belarusian Extraleague
Belarusian Extraleague seasons
Extra